In Transit is Covenant's second live album, released fall 2007. "Available as a CD and DVD, the releases showcase Covenant’s ability to defy all genre labels by their memorable stage show and outstanding compositions."

Track listing

References

External links
 http://www.covenant.se/
 http://www.metropolis-records.com/artists/?artist=covenant
 

2007 live albums
Covenant (band) live albums